Motsoko Pheko (born 13 November 1933) is a South African lawyer, author, historian, theologian, academic, and politician.

Biography
Born to a wealthy rural family in Lesotho on 13 November 1933, Pheko and his brother went to live in South Africa in the 1930s upon the sudden death of their parents. They were raised by E. M. Moerane, their late mother's sister. Since 1960 Motsoko Pheko has been a member of the Pan Africanist Congress of Azania (PAC), and served in several different capacities including Organiser, Branch Chairperson, Country Representative and Member of Parliament (MP). Pheko served as a representative of the PAC to the United Nations in New York and Geneva, in addition to working in the UK, Zambia. Pheko was the president of the PAC in South Africa until 2008.Previously he was the Deputy President in three cabinets from 1995 to 2003. This is the longest presidential term in PAC history. Sobukwe served from 1959 to 1978, Leballo from 1978 to 1986.

Pheko is the founder of Daystar University in Kenya, the largest liberal arts college in Africa. Pheko is also founder and Chair of Tokoloho Development Association in South Africa, a trust which promotes research of indigenous knowledge of the African people prior to European colonisation, and publishes the results.  Tokoloho is Sotho and translates as "Freedom".

Pheko holds a B.A. from the University of South Africa (UNISA), where he majored in Political Science and Systematic Theology, also reading Sociology and History. UNISA has honoured Pheko with an archive that holds many of his own works. Pheko also holds a Bachelor of Law degree from the University of Zambia and a Master of Law degree in international law from the University of London.

Published works
Pheko is an author of several books on topics such as history, law, political science and theology, including:
 African Renaissance Saved Christianity
 Apartheid: The Story of the Dispossessed people
 Betrayal of a Colonised People
 The Rise of Azania, the Fall of South Africa
 The Early Church in Africa
 Hidden Side of South African Politics
 The History of Robben Island Must Be Preserved
 The Land Is Ours: The Political Legacy of Mangaliso Sobukwe
 Who Are The Africans? – Indigenous Names and Identity
 The True History of Sharpeville Must Be Told

Notes

Alumni of the University of London
Living people
1933 births
University of Zambia alumni
South African people imprisoned abroad
Prisoners and detainees of South Africa
Prisoners and detainees of Rhodesia
Prisoners and detainees of Mozambique
Pan Africanist Congress of Azania politicians
Members of the National Assembly of South Africa
Lesotho emigrants to South Africa